Elaphromyia multisetosa is a species of tephritid or fruit flies in the genus Elaphromyia of the family Tephritidae.

Distribution
China, Taiwan.

References

Tephritinae
Insects described in 1933
Diptera of Asia